Vrindaban Road railway station is on the Agra–Delhi chord.  It is located in Mathura district in the Indian state of Uttar Pradesh. Its code is VRBD. It serves Vrindavan town. The station consists of four platforms. The platforms are not well sheltered. It lacks many facilities including water and sanitation.
Ashish Kumar is currently serving as the station manager

Overview

Krishna was born in Mathura. He spent his childhood in Vrindavan.  Therefore, both are major pilgrimage centres for Hindus.

History

The station lies on Delhi–Mathura branch line of Delhi–Kanpur section of North Central Railway.

See also 

 Vrindavan railway station
 Mathura Junction railway station

References

External links

Vrindavan Road Railway Station Details

Railway stations in Mathura district
Agra railway division
Vrindavan